Snow chains, or tire chains, are devices fitted to the tires of vehicles to provide increased traction when driving through snow and ice.

Snow chains attach to the drive wheels of a vehicle or special systems deploy chains which swing under the tires automatically. Although named after steel chain, snow chains may be made of other materials and in a variety of patterns and strengths. Chains are usually sold in pairs and often must be purchased to match a particular tire size (tire diameter and tread width), although some designs can be adjusted to fit various sizes of tire. Some regions require chains to be used under some weather conditions, but other areas prohibit the use of chains, as they can deteriorate road surfaces.

History
Snow chains were invented in 1904 by Harry D. Weed in Canastota, New York. Weed received  for his "Grip-Tread for Pneumatic Tires" on August 23, 1904. Weed's great-grandson, James Weed, said that Harry got the idea of creating chains for tires when he saw drivers wrap rope, or even vines, around their tires to increase traction on muddy or snowy roads, which were very common at the turn of the 20th century. (At this time, most people in rural Northern regions wouldn't bother driving automobiles in the winter at all, since roads were usually rolled for use with horse-drawn sleighs, rather than plowed. Automobiles were generally not winter vehicles, for a variety of reasons until the 1930s or 1940s in some areas. Only in urban areas was it possible to remove snow from streets.) He sought to make a traction device that was more durable and would work with snow as well as mud.

In July 1935, the Canadian Auguste Trudeau obtained a patent for his tread and anti-skidding chain.

Deployment
In snowy conditions, transportation authorities may require that snow chains or other traction aids be installed on vehicles, or at least supplied for them. This can apply to all vehicles, or only those without other traction aids, such as four-wheel drive or special tires. Local requirements may be enforced at checkpoints or by other type of inspection. Snow chains should be installed on one or more drive axles of the vehicle, with requirements varying for dual-tire or multi-driven-axle vehicles that range from "one pair of tires on a driven axle" to "all tires on all driven axles", possibly also one or both steering (front) wheels, requiring snow chains whenever required by signage or conditions.

In case of running wheel loaders, it is recommended to use special protection chains due to intense pressure on tires during work.

United States
Tires come with standardized tire code sizing information, found on the sidewalls of the tires. The first letter(s), indicate the vehicle type (P for passenger, LT for light truck). The next three digits indicate the tire's width in millimeters. The middle two digit number indicates the tire's height-to-width ratio. The next character is a letter "R", which indicates radial ply tires (rather than radius). followed by a final two digit number indicating the rim size for the vehicle's wheels.

Additionally, the correct Society of Automotive Engineers (SAE) class of snow chains must be installed, based on the wheel clearance of the vehicle.

The SAE Class "S" well clearance is a common requirement on newer cars, especially if after-market wider, low-profile, or larger tires and/or wheels are fitted.

The classes are defined as follows:

 SAE Class S: Regular (non-reinforced) passenger tire traction devices for vehicles with restricted wheel well clearance.
 SAE Class U: Regular (non-reinforced) and lug-reinforced passenger tire traction devices for vehicles with regular (non-restricted) wheel well clearances.
 SAE Class W: Passenger tire traction devices that use light truck components, as well as some light truck traction devices.

Common chain failures
 Driving too fast with chains. Recommended maximum speeds in the owners' manual of the chains – generally  – maximum.
 Driving on dry roads with chains for extended periods of time.
 Driving on dry roads with chains can cause a vehicle to slide when braking. 
 Driving on dry roads with chains will rapidly wear the chains.
 Not securing the chains tightly enough. Owners' manual of the chains recommends tightening a second time after driving a short distance and checking for tightness from time to time. If a chain comes loose, it should either be refastened or removed before it wraps around the drive axle of the vehicle.
 Tensioners or adjusters may be required. (Some chains have automatic tensioners and may be damaged if tensioners are used.)
 Installing chains on non-drive wheels.
 Accelerating too rapidly causing tire spin and stress on chains
 If a chain does break, it can cause vehicle damage by slapping around inside the wheel well, possibly wrapping around the axle and severing brake lines

Varieties and alternatives

Tire chains are available in a variety of types that have different advantages of cost, ride smoothness, traction, durability, ease of installation, and recommended travel speed.

Materials include steel (in the form of links or cables), polyurethane, rubber, and fabric. The original-style steel-link chains are also available in a variety of carbon steel and steel alloys and link shapes. Link shapes include standard, twisted, square, and reinforced. The shape of the links changes the flexibility, grip, and strength of the chain. The links can also have added studs or V-bars for an even more aggressive traction. The use of alloy steel and hardened steel adds durability. Traction cables (cable chains, snow cables) attach like chains but are made from cable rather than chain.

Chain patterns include the ladder, diagonal, or pattern types. Ladder type chains have cross chains perpendicular to the road and look like a ladder when carefully laid on the ground. With diagonal chains, the cross chains are diagonal to the road. Pattern types form a "net" over the tire such as a diamond or multiple diamond pattern. Some industrial pattern types also include studded, metal rings to which the chains attach and thus are called ring chains.

Most tire chains are wrapped around the circumference of the tires and held in place with rim chains, which may be chain or cable, elastic or adjustable tensioners. Automatic chains do not wrap around the tire but swing under the tire from devices permanently mounted under the vehicle which deploy via an electronic solenoid activated in the cab. Some tire chains mount onto the tires from only one side. Others use a ratcheting system for easier installation.

Alternatives include studded tires, which are snow tires with metal studs individually mounted into holes in the treads; emergency traction devices which may be similar to tire chains but mount around the tire through openings in the rim; and snow socks, which are fabric rather than chain or cable. These allow higher operating speeds and don't require the operator to install them (studs), but chains generally give the best traction in severe conditions.

Mud chains are similar to snow chains but for off-road, four-wheel drive applications, and generally they are larger than snow chains; they are often seen on heavy off-road equipment like log skidders, which have to operate over very rough, muddy terrain.

Wheel tracks are heavy duty assemblies similar to chains but with rigid cross links such as sometimes used on logging equipment.

Legality of use
Laws vary considerably regarding the legality of snow chain use. Some countries require them in certain snowy conditions or during certain months of the year, while other countries prohibit their use altogether to preserve road surfaces.

See also
 Crampons
 Ice cleat
 Snow socks
 Snow tires

References

External links

 Yosemite National Park Tire Chains Page

Chains
Vehicle safety technologies
Inclement weather management